Vocus Group Limited, formerly known as Vocus Communications, is an international telecommunications company headquartered in North Sydney, Australia. Founded by James Spenceley as a wholesale, business, government and consumer telecommunications provider, Vocus owns and manages Australia's second largest intercapital fibre network. Vocus provides retail, wholesale and corporate telecommunications services across Australia and New Zealand. Vocus offers data network services such as Internet, dark fibre, IP WAN, unified communications and telephony and cloud services to mid, large and corporate businesses direct and also acts as a wholesaler. The company owns and operates 18 data centres across Australia and New Zealand and has an onshore network operations centre run by the engineers who built the network.

Vocus acquired Perth-based Amcom in 2015. Vocus merged with M2 Group on 22 February 2016 in a merger worth AU$3.75 billion, before which it reported profits of AU$62.25M. The merger made it Australia's fourth largest telecommunications company, with 471,000 subscribers.

The company acquired Nextgen Networks for $861 million in October 2016. This allows Vocus access to the National Broadband Network backhaul and infrastructure in Northern Australia serving the offshore gas projects.

Vocus was acquired by Voyage Australia Pty Limited, a consortium of Macquarie Infrastructure and Real Assets (MIRA) and superannuation fund Aware Super, in 2021.

History
Vocus was founded by entrepreneur James Spenceley in March 2008. In 2013, Spenceley came in at No 81 on the BRW's Young Rich list after the business raised its annual revenue to $67 million. Two years later, Spenceley became one of the youngest Australians in history to run a company worth more than $1 billion after Vocus merged with Perth-based Amcom.

Amcom was founded in 1988 by Andrew Mclean to provide cabling services to CBD-based corporations and institutions in Perth.  Amcom acquired a telecommunications carrier licence in 1998 and began building a fibre optic network. In 2009 Amcom won the Best Telecommunications Company of the Year 2009 - Australian Telecommunications Magazine.

In December 2014, the board of Amcom approved the acquisition of the group by Vocus for AU$653 million. In April 2015, rival TPG Telecom increased its shareholder stake in Amcom to 18.6 per cent in an attempt to block the merger. TPG eventually built its stake to 19.9 per cent of Amcom. In response, a campaign to persuade at least 75 per cent of shareholders to vote in favour of the merger was launched by both Amcom and Vocus. On June 15, 2015, the merger went ahead after 77 percent of Amcom shareholders voted in favour of the merger. In July 2015 the $1.2 billion merger between Amcom and Vocus was formally completed. On June 29, 2015, CEO Clive Stein resigned after a 16-year career with the company to make way for incoming Vocus CEO Spenceley to take over the combined group.

Executive director and founder Spenceley and non-executive director Tony Grist left the board of Vocus in October 2016 after a failed leadership succession proposal.

In February 2018 CEO Geoff Horth left the company. In March 2018 M2 Group Founding MD and CEO Vaughan Bowen stepped away from the role of Non-Executive Chairman of the Vocus Board to increase Board independence, and former Telstra Chairman and founding CEO of Optus, Robert Mansfield AO was made Chairman. Michael Simmons became Interim CEO until the appointment of Kevin Russell on 28 May 2018.

In April 2018, Vocus announced it had decided not to sell off the NZ portion of the business as an acceptable offer had not been received.

Vocus acquisitions
Vocus has made several acquisitions to extend its product and service offering. In 2014, Vocus purchased a data centre from ASG Group for $11.7 million. In 2014 it also acquired Bentley data centre in Perth from IT provider ASG for $11.7m. The same year, it acquired FX Networks, a New Zealand-based fibre provider which services many of New Zealand's major organisations including many government agencies, telco carriers, ISPs and enterprises. In 2015, it acquired Enterprise Data Corporation, including two Sydney and Melbourne based data centres for $23.5 million. In 2015, Vocus acquired a 10% stake in the SEA-ME-WE 3 Cable from Telecom NZ, increasing the company's investment in Western Australia.

 Vocus Communications
 
 2016-12-01 Switch Utilities,  up front, and a provisionally deferred amount of 
 2016-10-26 Nextgen Networks, North-West Cable System and ASC, 
 2016-02-22 M2 Group, 
 2015-08-07 Amcom, 
 2015-04-01 Enterprise Data Corporation 
 2014-08-13 Bentley Data Centre 
 2014-07-13 FX Networks, 
 2014-05-07 iBOSS International and One Telecom, 
 2013-01-18 Ipera Communications, 
 2012-06-19 Maxnet and DataLock, 
 2011-05-06 Digital River Networks, 
 2011-05-02 Perth International Exchange, 
  2010-11-12, E3 Networks (Sydney and Melbourne),

Amcom acquisitions 

In September 2005, Amcom acquired the customers of Perth Internet service provider Arachnet for A$1.6 million, adding 5,200 broadband and 2,100 dial-up customers to their user base, increasing Amcom's total broadband numbers to 7,500. In April 2007 Amcom Telecommunications completed the A$6.25 million acquisition of People Telecom's Perth-based corporate services business. The acquired assets include a client base using fibre and DSL-based broadband services and a large data centre facility with some 600 square metres of space. In February 2010, Amcom announced that it intended to acquire 100% of the issued share capital of IP Systems Pty Ltd, an IP communications company delivering voice, video and data solutions to Australia and New Zealand. The $5.3 million acquisition was completed in May 2010. Amcom bought out L7 Solutions Pty Ltd in 2012 for A$15 million. This allowed Amcom to expand its footprint in IT integration, managed services and consulting and additional of about 200 clients. Amcom acquired aCure Technology on 22 August 2013 for $14.3 million

 2014-11-21 Megaport, 
 2013-09-26 aCure Technology, 
 2013-07-25 Global Networks AMC Data Centre, 
 2011-11-22 L7 Solutions, 
 2010-05-24 IP Systems, 
 2007-04-03 People Telecom, 
 2005-09-16 Arachnet, 
 2005-09-16 Swiftweb/Boldweb, 
 2005-09-16 ADSL Perth Broadband Internet, 
  2003-10-01 Amnet Internet Services, Amnet IT Services, Amnet IX and Ezsoftwrite

Brands

Wholesale and international
 Vocus

Business, enterprise and government - Australia
 Commander
 Vocus

Consumer - Australia
 Dodo
 iPrimus

Consumer - New Zealand
 2degrees
 Flip
 Orcon
 Slingshot
 Stuff Fibre
 Switch Utilities

Enterprise and wholesale - New Zealand
 2Talk
 Vocus

References

Companies based in Perth, Western Australia
Internet service providers of Australia
Australian companies established in 2008
Companies listed on the Australian Securities Exchange